The 2011 Torneo Intermedio (known as the Copa Movistar for sponsorship reasons) was played between June and July while the Peru national football team prepared for and competed in the 2011 Copa América. The tournament was played as a knockout competition, with the participation of the 16 teams of the Primera División, and 19 invited teams of which 5 compete in the Segunda División and 14 amateur teams. The winners, José Gálvez, disputed the 2012 Copa Federación against the 2011 Torneo Descentralizado champion, Juan Aurich.

Teams

Preliminary round 
All kick-off times are local (UTC−05:00).

First round
All kick-off times are local (UTC−05:00).

Bracket

Round of 16

First leg

Second leg

Sport Áncash win 5–2 on aggregate.

Tied 2-2 on aggregate. José Gálvez win 3–2 on penalties.

Tied 4-4 on aggregate. Sport Huancayo win 3–1 on penalties.

Sporting Cristal win 1-0 on aggregate.

Tied 3-3 on aggregate. Universidad César Vallejo win 4–3 on penalties.

Tied 1-1 on aggregate. Real Garcilaso win 4–3 on penalties.

Tied 4-4 on aggregate. Alianza Unicachi win 3–2 on penalties.

Tied 3-3 on aggregate. Deportivo Municipal win 5–3 on penalties.

Quarterfinals

First leg

Second leg 

Tied 2-2 on aggregate. Sport Áncash win 6-5 on penalties.

Tied 2-2 on aggregate. Sport Huancayo win 4-2 on penalties.

Tied 4-4 on aggregate. José Gálvez win 6-5 on penalties.

Semifinals

First leg

Second leg 

Tied 3-3 on aggregate. Sport Áncash win 7-6 on penalties.

Finals

Top goalscorers
6 goals 
  Fabricio Lenci (Sport Áncash)
3 goals 
  Cesar Medina (José Gálvez)
  José Shoro (Alianza Unicachi)
  Giancarlo Chichizola (Real Garcilaso)
  Einer Vasquez (Sport Áncash)
  Irven Avila (Sport Huancayo)
2 goals 
  Jonathan Obregón (Unión Huaral)
  Juan Carrillo (Sport Áncash)
  Miguel Silva (José Gálvez)
  Andy Pando (Sporting Cristal)
  Manuel Tejada (Universidad San Martín)
  Jorge Cazulo (Universidad César Vallejo)
  Reynaldo Rojas (Grau)
  Christian Sánchez (José María Arguedas)
  Manco Salinas (Unión Huaral)
  Deyair Reyes (Sport Huancayo)
  Robert Ardiles (Alianza Unicachi) 
  Edgar Romani (Sportivo Huracán)

References

External links
Peruvian Football Federation
RSSSF

 

2011 domestic association football cups
2011 in Peruvian football